Malcolm MacLeod Atterbury (February 20, 1907 – August 16, 1992) was an American stage, film, and television actor, and vaudevillian.

Early years and education
A native of Philadelphia, Atterbury was the son of Malcolm MacLeod, Sr. and Arminia Clara (Rosengarten) MacLeod. He had an older sister, Elizabeth, a twin brother, Norman, and a younger brother, George Rosengarten MacLeod. After his father's death his mother remarried to General William Wallace Atterbury, president of Pennsylvania Railroad. Through this marriage he had a half-brother, William Wallace Atterbury Jr.

He graduated from The Hill School in Pottstown, Pennsylvania.

In the mid-1930s, Atterbury decided to pursue a career in drama. He enrolled at Hilda Spong's Dramatic School using an assumed name. Later, after revealing his true identity, he went on to "finance a summer theater for the Hilda Spong Players at Cape May, and they, in turn, asked him to be their managing director."

Career

Radio
In 1928, Atterbury was the bass singer in a quartet that sang on WLIT in Philadelphia. In 1930, he became the program director of a radio station in Philadelphia. He went on to become business manager of WHAT.

Theatre
Atterbury was a devoted theatre actor.  He owned and operated two theatres in the Adirondack Mountains of New York, the Tamarack Playhouse in Lake Pleasant, New York and the Albany Playhouse Co. in Albany.  He also appeared on Broadway in the original cast of One Flew Over the Cuckoo's Nest, as Scanlon.

Film
Atterbury is perhaps best known for his uncredited role in Alfred Hitchcock's North by Northwest (1959), as the rural man who exclaims, "That plane's dustin' crops where there ain't no crops!" Four years later, Atterbury appeared as the Deputy in Hitchcock's The Birds (1963). He further appeared in such films as I Was a Teenage Werewolf (1957), Crime of Passion (1957), Blue Denim (1959), Wild River (1960), Advise and Consent (1962), and Hawaii (1966). His last film was Emperor of the North Pole (1973).

Television
Atterbury made frequent appearances on television. He was cast in five episodes of CBS's Perry Mason during the late 1950s and early 1960s, playing the role of murderer in three of the episodes such as Sam Burris in the 1957 episode, "The Case of the Angry Mourner". 

His guest-starring roles included appearances on Gunsmoke, The Twilight Zone, Alfred Hitchcock Presents, The Asphalt Jungle, Have Gun - Will Travel (episode: "Shot by Request"), Wagon Train, Window on Main Street, Straightaway,  Bonanza, Hazel, Kentucky Jones, The Odd Couple (1970 TV series, episode: "A Barnacle Adventure"), The Rookies, The Sheriff of Cochise, The Fugitive, State Trooper, Rescue 8, Fury, The Man from Blackhawk, The Tall Man, The Invaders (episode: "The Trial") and The Andy Griffith Show (episode: "The Cow Thief", 1962), The Bob Newhart Show (episode: "No Sale"). 

He had a regular role as Grandfather Aldon in the 1974–75 CBS television family drama, Apple's Way.

Personal life
Atterbury was married on February 6, 1937 to Ellen Ayres Hardies (1915–1994) of Amsterdam, New York, daughter of judge Charles E. Hardies Sr. and sister of Charles Hardies Jr., who later became Montgomery County district attorney.

FilmographyDragnet (1954) - Lee ReinhardMan Without a Star (1955) - Fancy Joe Toole (uncredited)The Rawhide Years (1955) - Luke, Paymaster (uncredited)Silent Fear (1956) - Dr. VernonGunsmoke (1956) - SeldonThe Lone Ranger (1956) - Phineas Tripp (uncredited)
 Frontier (1956) Season 1, Episode 19 The Assassin as DonleyThe Steel Jungle (1956) - MailmanMiracle in the Rain (1956) - Special Delivery Man (uncredited)Stranger at My Door (1956) - Rev. HastingsA Day of Fury (1956) - Gaunt Farmer (uncredited)Crime in the Streets (1956) - Mr. McAllisterDakota Incident (1956) - Bartender / Desk ClerkJohnny Concho (1956) - Milo, Mail Dispatcher (uncredited)Storm Center (1956) - Frank (uncredited)Toward the Unknown (1956) - Hank - Bell Technical Rep.
 Reprisal! (1956) - Luther Creel (uncredited)Crime of Passion (1957) - Police Officer SpitzSlander (1957) - Byron (uncredited)Hot Summer Night (1957) - Jim - Newspaper Man on Street (uncredited)Fury at Showdown (1957) - NorrisI Was a Teenage Werewolf (1957) - Charles RiversValerie (1957) - SheriffBlood of Dracula (1957) - Lt. DunlapThe Walter Winchell File "The Witness" (1957) - MAJ Frank Spears The Dalton Girls (1957) - Mr. Sewell, the Bank ManagerToo Much, Too Soon (1958) - Older Attrendant (scenes deleted)The High Cost of Loving (1958) - Harry Lessing (uncredited)From Hell to Texas (1958) - Hotel ClerkNo Time for Sergeants (1958) - Bus Driver with Applications (uncredited)How to Make a Monster (1958) - Security Guard RichardsBadman's Country (1958) - Buffalo Bill CodyRio Bravo (1959) - Jake (Stage Driver) (scenes deleted)High School Big Shot (1959) - Mr. GrantNorth by Northwest (1959) - Man at prairie crossing (uncredited)Blue Denim (1959) - Marriage License Clerk (uncredited)Hell Bent for Leather (1960) - GambleWild River (1960) - Sy MooreFrom the Terrace (1960) - George FrySummer and Smoke (1961) - Rev. WinemillerAdvise & Consent (1962) - Senator Tom AugustThe Birds (1963) - Deputy Al MaloneCattle King (1963) - Abe ClevengerSeven Days in May (1964) - Horace - White House Physician (uncredited)

The Fugitive (1964 TV series 2, episode 3 ‘Man on a String’-Sheriff Mead Joy in the Morning (1965) - Willis J. Calamus (uncredited)
The Fugitive (1966 ‘Stroke of Genius’, season 3, episode 20) - Sheriff BilsonThe Chase (1966) - Mr. ReevesHawaii (1966) - Gideon HaleThe Hardy Boys: The Mystery of the Chinese Junk (1967) - Clams DaggettThe Learning Tree (1969) - Silas NewhallEmperor of the North (1973) - HoggerThe Towering Inferno (1974) - Jeweler (uncredited)Little House on the Prairie'' (1979) - Brewster Davenport

References

External links
 
 
 
 

1907 births
1992 deaths
20th-century American male actors
20th-century American male singers
20th-century American singers
American male film actors
American male stage actors
American male television actors
Male actors from Philadelphia
The Hill School alumni